Mayors of Key West, Florida in the United States have reflected the city's cultural and ethnic heritage including Cuban and openly gay mayors.

1822–1828 — John H. Fleming, Mayor (head of chamber of commerce as well) 
1828–1828 — Edgar Macon, Mayor
A. 1828–1830 — Edgar Macon, President of the Town Council
B. 1831–1832 — D. C. Pinkham, President of the Town Council
1832–1833 — Oliver O'Hara, Mayor
1833–1834 — Fielding A. Browne
1834–1835 — Adam Gordon
1835–1837 — Fielding A. Browne (2nd Term)
1837–1838 — William A. Whitehead
1838–1839 — Tomaso Saccheti (Socarty)
1839–1840 — Pardon C. Greene
1840–1841 — Philip J. Fontaine
1841–1842 — Alexander Patterson
1842–1844 — Philip J. Fontaine (2nd Term)
1844–1846 — Benjamin Sawyer
1846–1848 — Walter C. Maloney
1848–1852 — Alexander Patterson (2nd Term)
1852–1853 — Fernando J. Moreno
1853–1854 — John W. Porter
1854–1854 — John W. Porter (2nd Term)
1854–1855 — William Curry
1855–1856 — Philip J. Fontaine (3rd Term)
1856–1857 — Alexander Patterson (3rd Term)
1857–1861 — John P. Baldwin
1861–1861 — William Marvin
1861–1864 — Alexander Patterson (4th Term)
1864–1865 — E. O. Gwynn
1865–1866 — Alexander Patterson (5th Term)
1866–1866 — William Marvin (2nd Term)
1866–1867 — E. O. Gwynn (2nd Term)
1867–1868 — Alexander Patterson (6th Term)
1868–1868 — Henry Mulrennan
1868–1868 — W. S. Allen
1868–1869 — Dr. D. W. Whitehurst
1869–1870 — uncertain
1870–1870 — Henry Mulrennan (2nd Term)
1870–1871 — Joseph B. Browne
1871–1872 — William D. Cash
1872–1873 — Winer Bethel
1873–1874 — W. S. Allen (2nd Term)
1874–1875 — E. O. Gwynn (3rd Term)
1875–1876 — Carlos M. de Cespedes
1876–1880 — Livingston W. Bethel
1880–1881 — Robert Jasper Perry
1881–1882 — E. O. Gwynn (4th Term)
1882–1883 — William McClintock
1883–1885 — R. Alfred Monsalvatage
1885–1886 — James G. Jones
1886–1888 — J. W. V. R. Plummer
1888–1889 — James A. Waddell
1889–1891 — Walter C. Maloney, Jr.
1891–1895 — Robert Jasper Perry (2nd Term) 
1895–1897 — James A. Waddell (2nd Term)
1897–1898 — John B. Maloney
1898–1903 — George L. Bartlum
1903–1905 — Benjamin D. Trevor
1905–1907 — George L. Babcock
1907–1915 — Dr. Joseph N. Fogarty
1915–1917 — Norberg Thompson
1917–1919 — Allen B. Cleare
1919–1921 — Louis E. Otto
1921–1925 — Frank H. Ladd
1925–1933 — Leslie A. Curry
1933–1935 — William H. Malone
1935–1937 — Henry C. Galey 
1937–1945 — Willard Albury 
1945–1945 — William W. Demeritt
1945–1945 — John Carbonell 
1945–1947 — William W. Demeritt (2nd Term)
1947–1949 — A. Maitland Adams
1949–1950 — Louis M. J. Eisner
1950–1951 — John Carbonell (2nd Term)
1951–1951 — Louis M. J. Eisner (2nd Term)
1951–1957 — C. B. Harvey
1957–1961 — Delio Cobo
1961–1963 — C. B. Harvey (2nd Term)
1963–1969 — Kermit Lewin
1969–1971 — Delio Cobo (2nd Term)
1971–1981 — Charles "Sonny" McCoy
1981–1983 — Dennis Wardlow
1983–1985 — Richard A. Heyman
1985–1987 — Tom Sawyer
1987–1989 — Richard A. Heyman (2nd Term)
1989–1989 — John Ingahm 
1989–1991 — Tony Tarracino
1991–1995 — Dennis Wardlow (2nd Term)
1995–1995 — Tom Sawyer
1995–1997 — Dennis Wardlow (3rd Term)
1997–1999 — Sheila Mullins
1999–2005 — Jimmy Weekley
2005–2009 — Morgan McPherson   
2009–2018 — Craig Cates
2018–present — Teri Johnston

Notes

References
Elected mayors of Key West, as listed in Jefferson B. Browne's Key West: The Old and The New (1912) with additions provided by Monroe County Public Library Historian Tom Hambright, The State Library of Florida, and WorldStatesmen.org.

Key West

History of Key West, Florida